A total of 55 teams entered the 1958 FIFA World Cup qualification rounds, competing for a total of 16 spots in the final tournament. Sweden as the hosts and West Germany, as the defending champions, qualified automatically, leaving 14 spots open for competition.

Qualification Process
The qualification rounds for the four previous World Cups differed widely, with controversial rules and many withdrawals. From this tournament onwards, FIFA divided the teams into several continental zones, assigned a pre-determined number of places in the final tournament to each zone, and delegated the organisation of the qualifying tournaments to its confederations: UEFA of Europe, CONMEBOL of South America, NAFC of North America, CCCF of Central America and Caribbean, CAF of Africa and AFC of Asia (and OFC of Oceania after it was formed later).

The 16 spots available in the 1958 World Cup would be distributed among the continental zones as follows:
Europe (UEFA): 11 places, 2 of them went to automatic qualifiers Sweden and West Germany, while the other 9 places were contested by 27 teams.
South America (CONMEBOL): 3 places, contested by 9 teams.
North, Central America and Caribbean (NAFC/CCCF): 1 place, contested by 6 teams.
Africa (CAF) and Asia (AFC): 1 place, contested by 11 teams (including Israel, Cyprus and Turkey).
However, FIFA also imposed a rule that no team would qualify without playing at least one match because many teams qualified for previous World Cups without playing due to withdrawals of their opponents. Because Israel  won the African and Asian zone under this circumstance, FIFA required them to enter a play-off against a team from Europe who initially did not qualify, with the winner of this play-off qualifying. Therefore, effectively in the end, a total of 11.5 places were granted to Europe while only 0.5 places were granted to Africa and Asia.

A total of 46 teams played at least one qualifying match. A total of 89 qualifying matches were played, and 341 goals were scored (an average of 3.83 per match).

Listed below are the dates and results of the qualification rounds.

Confederation qualification

AFC and CAF

CCCF and NAFC

The 6 teams were divided into 2 groups with 3 teams each (Group 1 with teams from North America and Group 2 with teams from Central America and Caribbean). The teams played each other on a home-and-away basis. The group winners advanced to the Final Round. The two teams played against each other on a home-and-away basis with the winner qualifying for the final tournament.

CONMEBOL

The 9 teams were divided into 3 groups of 3 teams each. The teams played against each other on a home-and-away basis. The group winners would qualify.

UEFA

The 27 teams were divided into 9 groups, each featuring 3 teams. The teams played against each other on a home-and-away basis. The group winners would qualify. Denmark, East Germany, Iceland and the Soviet Union made their debuts in World Cup qualification.

Inter-confederation play-offs: AFC/CAF v UEFA

A special play-off was created between Israel and the runner-up of one of the UEFA/CONMEBOL/CCCF/NAFC Groups, where the teams played against each other on a home-and-away basis, with the winner qualifying. Two-time champions Uruguay withdrew, while Northern Ireland and Italy had one final match yet to play, so all three were left out. Belgium, Bulgaria, Wales, Netherlands, Poland, Romania, Spain, Peru, Bolivia and Costa Rica were left to draw. After Belgium refused, Wales, the runner-up of UEFA Group 4, was the team drawn from the UEFA group runners-up.

Qualified teams

Goalscorers

8 goals

 Tommy Taylor

7 goals

 Thadée Cisowski

5 goals

 Crescencio Gutiérrez
 Jackie Mudie

4 goals

 Paul Vandenberg
 Tadeusz Kraus
 John Atyeo
 Ferenc Machos
 Rusli Ramang
 Edward Jankowski
 Nikita Simonyan
 Ladislao Kubala

3 goals

 Omar Oreste Corbatta
 Norberto Menéndez
 Gerhard Hanappi
 Maurice Willems
 Máximo Alcócer
 Hristo Iliev
 Jorge Hernán Monge
 Rodolfo Herrera González
 Álvaro Murillo
 Jean Vincent
 Dermot Curtis
 Alfredo Hernández
 Héctor Hernández
 Salvador Reyes Monteón
 Abe Lenstra
 Noud van Melis
 Jimmy McIlroy
 Juan Bautista Agüero
 Florencio Amarilla
 Anatoli Ilyin
 Eduard Streltsov
 Des Palmer
 Muhamed Mujić

2 goals

 Roberto Zárate
 Hans Buzek
 Theodor Wagner
 Henri Coppens
 Victor Mees
 Richard Orlans
 Georgi Dimitrov
 Panayot Panayotov
 Art Hughes
 Brian Philley
 Gogie Stewart
 Jaime Ramírez
 Mario Cordero
 Rubén Jiménez Rodríguez
 Danilo Montero Campos
 Wilfred de Lanoy
 Ove Bech Nielsen
 Günther Wirth
 Duncan Edwards
 Célestin Oliver
 Roger Piantoni
 Joseph Ujlaki
 Francisco López Contreras
 Lajos Csordás
 Nándor Hidegkuti
 Ríkharður Jónsson
 Þórður Jónsson
 Þórður Þórðarson
 Guido Gratton
 Carlos González
 Héctor Hernández
 Ligorio López
 Enrique Sesma
 Cor van der Gijp
 Harald Hennum
 Ángel Jara Saguier
 Enrique Jara Saguier
 Lucjan Brychczy
 Gerard Cieślik
 Manuel Vasques
 Alexandru Ene
 Anatoli Isayev
 Igor Netto
 Estanislao Basora
 Alfredo di Stéfano
 Luis Suárez Miramontes
 Josef Hügi
 Roger Vonlanthen
 Ed Murphy
 Ivor Allchurch
 Cliff Jones
 Miloš Milutinović

1 goal

 Norberto Conde
 Eliseo Prado
 Robert Dienst
 Walter Haummer
 Karl Koller
 Ernst Kozlicek
 Helmut Senekowitsch
 Karl Stotz
 Otto Walzhofer
 André Van Herpe
 Denis Houf
 André Piters
 Ricardo Alcón
 Ausberto García
 Didi
 Índio
 Spiro Debarski
 Todor Diev
 Ivan Petkov Kolev
 Krum Yanev
 Norm McLeod
 Ostap Steckiw
 Guillermo Díaz
 Nian Weisi
 Sun Fucheng
 Wang Lu
 Zhang Honggen
 Carlos Arango
 Ricardo Díaz
 Jaime Gutiérrez
 Juan Soto Quiros
 Edgard Meulens
 Hubert Sambo
 Vlastimil Bubník
 Pavol Molnár
 Anton Moravčík
 Ladislav Novák
 Aage Rou Jensen
 John Jensen
 Manfred Kaiser
 Helmut Müller
 Willy Tröger
 Johnny Haynes
 Olavi Lahtinen
 Mauri Vanhanen
 Said Brahimi
 René Dereuddre
 Maryan Wisnieski
 Kostas Nestoridis
 Vaggelis Panakis
 Augusto Espinoza
 Jorge Vickers
 József Bozsik
 Károly Sándor
 Lajos Tichy
 Eddang Witarsa
 George Cummins
 Johnny Gavin
 Alf Ringstead
 Sergio Cervato
 Dino da Costa
 Gino Pivatelli
 Jean-Pierre Fiedler
 Johnny Halsdorf
 Léon Letsch
 Jaime Belmonte
 Toon Brusselers
 Coen Dillen
 Kees Rijvers
 Servaas Wilkes
 Billy Bingham
 Tommy Casey
 Wilbur Cush
 Billy Simpson
 Kjell Kristiansen
 Óscar Aguilera
 Alberto Terry
 Ginter Gawlik
 Matateu
 António Dias Teixeira
 Cornel Cacoveanu
 Titus Ozon
 Iosif Petschovsky
 Nicolae Tǎtaru
 John Hewie
 Tommy Ring
 Archie Robertson
 Alex Scott
 Gordon Smith
 Genrich Fedosov
 Valentin Kozmich Ivanov
 Boris Tatushin
 Yuri Voinov
 Miguel González
 Enrique Mateos
 Suleiman Faris
 Siddiq Manzul
 Robert Ballaman
 Ferdinando Riva
 Jabra Al-Zarqa
 Harry Keough
 Ruben Mendoza
 James Murphy
 Javier Ambrois
 Eladio Benítez
 William Martínez
 Óscar Míguez
 Dave Bowen
 Mel Charles
 Roy Vernon
 Dobrosav Krstić
 Aleksandar Petaković

1 own goal

 Edgar Falch (playing against Hungary)
 Ray Daniel (playing against Czechoslovakia)

See also
 Conspiracy 58

Notes
Wales is the only team to ever qualify after having been eliminated and then reinstated. Their qualification meant that all four Home Nations qualified (the only time in history), and that no team from the separate African and Asian zone qualified. This remained Wales' only appearance in the finals until 2022, when they qualified through the European zone for the first time.
Two-time former champions Uruguay, who in their three previous appearances had always benefited from direct qualifications or withdrawals, now failed in what was the first time they actually had to play qualifying games.
Italy were eliminated in qualifying for the first time.

Footnotes

External links
FIFA World Cup Official Site - 1958 World Cup Qualification
RSSSF - 1958 World Cup Qualification

 
Qualification
FIFA World Cup qualification
World Cup
World